Rosalie Lorraine Gill (1867–1898) was an American painter.

Biography
Gill was born in 1867 in Elmira, New York. At the age of 12 she began studying in art in New York City, at the Art Students League of New York, and with William Merritt Chase. In the late 1880s she moved to Paris where she studied with Alfred Stevens.

In 1889 Gill exhibited at the Exposition Universelle and she exhibited her work at the Palace of Fine Arts and the Woman's Building at the 1893 World's Columbian Exposition in Chicago, Illinois.

Gill remained in Paris, where she married Rene Lara in 1897 and held the title Comptesse de Chalan (Countess of Chaland).  Gill died the next year, 1898, at the age of 31.

Gallery

References

External links
 

1867 births
1898 deaths
American women painters
19th-century American women artists
19th-century American painters
People from Elmira, New York
Painters from New York (state)
Art Students League of New York alumni
Students of William Merritt Chase